Pagin (also Romanized as Pagīn) is a village in Soltanabad Rural District, in the Central District of Ramhormoz County, Khuzestan Province, Iran. At the 2006 census, its population was 33, in 7 families.

References 

Populated places in Ramhormoz County